The Road to Hollywood is a 1947 American film released by Astor Pictures that is a combination of several of Bing Crosby's Educational Pictures short subjects. The title was designed to draft off Paramount Pictures' "Road to..." film series starring Crosby, Bob Hope, and Dorothy Lamour; Hope and Lamour do not appear in the film.

Plot
Bud Pollard narrates a biography of Bing Crosby stringing together the following short subjects:
 "I Surrender Dear" (1931) 
 "One More Chance" (1931) 
 "Billboard Girl" (1931) 
 "Dream House" (1931)

Cast 
Bing Crosby as himself (archive footage)
Luis Alberni as The Marquis, from I Surrender Dear (archive footage)
Bud Pollard as himself (Host / Narrator)
Ann Christy as Betty Brooks, from Dream House (archive footage)
Patsy O'Leary as Ethel Bangs, from One More Chance / Mrs. McCullough, from I Surrender Dear (archive footage)
George C. Pearce as Mary's Father, from Billboard Girl (archive footage)
Arthur Stone as Ethel's Uncle Joe, from One More Chance / Jerry, Bing's friend from I Surrender Dear (archive footage)
Dick Stewart as Jerry, Bing's Chum from Billboard Girl (archive footage)
Lincoln Stedman as Whitman, Mary's Fiancé, from Billboard Girl (archive footage)
Kathrin Clare Ward as Mother Brooks, from Dream House (archive footage)
James Eagles as Mary's Brother, from Billboard Girl (archive footage)
Matty Kemp as Percy Howard, Bing's Rival, from One More Chance (archive footage)
Eddie Phillips as Reginald Duncan, from Dream House (archive footage)
Marion Sayers as Peggy, Bing's Sweetheart, from I Surrender Dear (archive footage)
Julia Griffith as Ethel's Mother, Bing's Future Mother-in-Law, from I Surrender Dear (archive footage)
George Gray as George Dobbs, from I Surrender Dear (archive footage)
Vernon Dent as A Film Director, from Dream House (archive footage)
Alice Adair as Ethel Dobbs, from I Surrender Dear (archive footage)
Marjorie Kane as Mary Malone, from Billboard Girl (archive footage)

Soundtrack 

All sung by Bing Crosby

From "I Surrender Dear"
 "I Surrender Dear"
 "At Your Command"
 "Out of Nowhere”
 "A Little Bit of Heaven" (Ernest R. Ball / J. Keirn Brennan)

From "One More Chance"
 "Just One More Chance"
 "Wrap Your Troubles in Dreams"
 "I Surrender Dear" (parody)
 I'd Climb the Highest Mountain

From "Dream House"
 "Dream House" (Earle Foxe / Lynn F. Cowan)
 "It Must Be True" (Harry Barris / Gus Arnheim / Gordon Clifford)
 "When I Take My Sugar to Tea” (Sammy Fain / Irving Kahal / Pierre Norman)

From "Billboard Girl"
 "Were You Sincere?" (Vincent Rose / Jack Meskill)
 "For You”

References

External links 

1947 films
1947 musical comedy films
American musical comedy films
American black-and-white films
1940s English-language films
1940s American films